Ângelo Gammaro (17 September 1895 – 12 June 1977) was a Brazilian sportsman. He competed at one Olympics for his native country. Born in Rio de Janeiro, he represented Brazil in swimming and water polo at the 1920 Olympics.

He was one of the first Brazilians who participated at the Olympics. At the 1920 Summer Olympics in Helsinki, the first time that Brazil participated in the Games, he swam the 100-meter freestyle, not reaching the finals. He also participated in the Water Polo, finishing fourth with the Brazil team.

References

1895 births
1977 deaths
Brazilian male freestyle swimmers
Brazilian male water polo players
Swimmers at the 1920 Summer Olympics
Water polo players at the 1920 Summer Olympics
Olympic swimmers of Brazil
Olympic water polo players of Brazil
Sportspeople from Rio de Janeiro (city)
20th-century Brazilian people